Tomas Roggeman (born 30 October 1986) is a Belgian-Flemish politician and a member of the New Flemish Alliance. He has served as an MP in the Member of the Chamber of Representatives since 2019 and was chairman of the Jong N-VA, the youth wing of the N-VA.

Biography
Roggeman graduated with a master's degree in history from Ghent University before beginning a doctoral degree at KU Leuven. He also worked as an associate teacher at the Vlerick Leuven Gent Management School. Between 2015 and 2019, he was chairman of the N-VA's youth wing Since 2012, he has served as a municipal councilor in Dendermonde. During the 2019 Belgian federal election, Roggeman was elected to the Chamber of Representatives for the East Flanders list.

References 

Living people
1986 births
21st-century Belgian politicians
People from Dendermonde
New Flemish Alliance politicians
Members of the Chamber of Representatives (Belgium)
Ghent University alumni
Catholic University of Leuven alumni
Academic staff of Vlerick Business School
Belgian city councillors